The  is an electric multiple unit (EMU) train type operated by East Japan Railway Company (JR East) in Japan on Saphir Odoriko limited express services between Tokyo and Izukyū-Shimoda. It was designed to replace the older 251 series trains that were used on Super View Odoriko limited express services from April 28, 1990, until March 13, 2020.

History
The trains are designed by Ken Okuyama Design, with exterior painted with sapphire blue to match with the blue sky of the Izu Peninsula. Two eight car sets were manufactured, by Kawasaki Heavy Industries' Hyogo factory (cars 1 to 3) and Hitachi's  (cars 4 to 8).

Set RS1 operated a trial run on November 21, 2019, and the trains entered service on March 14, 2020, the day after the 251 series Super View Odoriko sets were retired.

Technical specifications
The car bodies are made of aluminum, and the trains use three phase motors and VVVF inverters. Each car has one door per side; cars 3, 5, and 7 are fitted with pantographs, with the one on car 5 being for emergency use.

Formation
The trains are formed as eight-car sets, with five motored and three trailer cars. Car 1 faces towards Izukyū-Shimoda and car 8 towards Tokyo.

Interior

Premium Green Car (Car 1) 
Car 1 is designated as a "premium green car" with a 1+1 private seating layout. The fully power-reclining seats, made of leather and equipped with leg rest and luggage space under each seat, can be swiveled towards the window side for the view of Izu's seaside.

Green car private compartments (Cars 2 and 3) 
Cars 2 to 3 are designated as "green cars" with private compartment seating for groups of 4 to 6 people, and are priced higher than the "premium green car". Seats are arranged in transverse seating for the 4 person compartments and individual seatings for the 6 person compartments. All private compartments have the electrical power outlets.

Cafeteria (Car 4) 
Car 4 is designated as the cafeteria, with an open-style kitchen, counter seats, and table seats.

Green car (Cars 5 to 8) 
Cars 5 to 8 are designated as regular "green cars"; passenger accommodation consists of 2+1 seating throughout. Each seat are equipped with power outlets and can be reclined. Two single seats on car 5 are equipped with belts for wheelchairs.

Features 
All cars, except cars 2 to 4, have a luggage area at the end sections and overhead, and restrooms are available in cars 2, 3, and 7, with multi-accessible toilet located at car 5. All seats except private compartments are equipped with personal reading lights, and all cars feature WiFi connection.

See also 
 251 series, the limited express EMU type used on Super View Odoriko services prior to the introduction of the E261 series
Odoriko, the regular express service beside the limited express service

References

External links

 JR East press release 

Electric multiple units of Japan
East Japan Railway Company
Train-related introductions in 2020
1500 V DC multiple units of Japan
Kawasaki multiple units
Hitachi multiple units